The Mercury Press is a Canadian publishing company which publishes literary fiction, poetry, and non-fiction works by Canadians. Mercury has a substantial jazz list and has also published murder mysteries. Books published by Mercury have won or been shortlisted for awards including The Governor General's Award, The City of Toronto Book Award, and the Trillium Award.

History
In 1978, Glynn Davies founded the Aya Press, first publishing Ancient Music by Itzy Borstein. Over its eleven-year lifespan, the Aya Press published the work of experimental poets and culturally significant fiction.
On January 1, 1990, the Aya Press changed its name to The Mercury Press, meaning "messenger" or "signpost."

Funding
The Mercury Press is funded by contributions from the Canadian Council For the Arts, the Ontario Arts Council, the Ontario Media Development Corporation's Book Fund, and the Ontario Book Publishing Tax Credit Program.  It also receives funding from the Government of Canada through the Department of Canadian Heritage's Book Publishing Industry Development Program.

Notable authors

 Jack Chambers
 Mark Miller
 Gerry Shikatani
 Richard Truhlar
 Kenneth J. Harvey

References

External links
 Archives of The Mercury Press (The Mercury Press fonds, R16151) are held at Library and Archives Canada
 Archives of Aya Press (Aya Press fonds, R11702) are held at Library and Archives Canada. This fonds is related to The Mercury Press.

Book publishing companies of Canada